The Chinese Taipei Baseball Association (CTBA) was established for political compensation on February 28, 1973. The Chinese translation of the English name is: traditional Chinese: 中華台北棒球協會, hanyu pinyin: Zhōnghuá Táiběi bàngqiú xiéhuì. However its official Mandarin name is: traditional Chinese: 中華民國棒球協會, hanyu pinyin: Zhōnghuá Mínguó bàngqiú xiéhuì, which translated into English means: "Baseball Association of the Republic of China", Taiwan's official name. This is because of the legal status of Taiwan. Its goal was to spread and develop baseball in Taiwan (known as Chinese Taipei due to political pressure from the People's Republic of China), helping to host national and international baseball competitions in hope to enhance the quality of Taiwanese baseball, and also to enhance the health of the Taiwanese citizens as well as promoting sportsmanship.

Baseball was introduced to Taiwan during the Japanese occupation, and is claimed to be the one of the oldest national sport in Taiwanese history. The current and the 7th president Peng Chenghao took over the office in 1998.

Sponsored leagues and games 
 National Adult Class A Spring League (全國成棒甲組春季聯賽)
 Association Cup Championship (協會盃年度大賽)

Controversy 
During 2013 World Baseball Classic games, CTBA failed to fulfill obligations with the following incidents:

 CTBA promised famous former baseball player Kuo Tai-yuan (郭泰源) as the manager of Chinese Taipei. However, CPBL (中華職棒), who is responsible for the training affairs, designates Chang-Heng Hsieh (謝長亨) as the manager.
 No VIP Access: CTBA didn't issue VIP access to the chairman of CPBL, Huang Jhen-Tai (黃鎮台), in the first-round games held in Taichung, Taiwan. Neither did CTBA apply access to the games held in Tokyo Dome for him.
 No Breakfast Payment: Chinese Taipei coaches request unified breakfast service for the players. However, CTBA failed to have relative staff in scene. CPBL paid for the players tentatively.
 Distributed Arrival: After losing games on 3/9 to Cuba, Chinese Taipei players come back to Taiwan in an urge. They are separated into five flights.
 National Honor Prize: CTBA thought opponents of WBC games are superior to Chinese Taipei and didn't expect to win any titles. Therefore, they failed to apply National Honor Prize from Sport Administration, Ministry of Education (教育部體育署).

See also 
 Sport in Taiwan
 Chinese Taipei Olympic Committee
 Chinese Taipei national baseball team
 Chinese Taipei women's national baseball team
 Chinese Professional Baseball League
 Popcorn League
 WikiBaseball

References

External links 
  Official website
 Taiwan Culture Portal: The pride and sorrow of Taiwan adult national baseball teams  (in English)

Baseball governing bodies in Asia
Baseball in Taiwan
Sports organizations established in 1973
Baseball